, operating simply as CyberFight (CF), is a Japanese professional wrestling parent company based in Tokyo. It is a subsidiary of the CyberAgent internet advertising company. CyberFight serves as an umbrella brand for two existing promotions: Pro Wrestling Noah and DDT Pro-Wrestling and for DDT's two sub-brands Ganbare Pro-Wrestling and Tokyo Joshi Pro Wrestling.

History

DDT Pro-Wrestling
In April 1997, following the success of the first Judgement event held on March 25, Sanshiro Takagi, Mikami and Nosawa Rongai left the Pro Wrestling Crusaders promotion to start their own promotion called Dramatic Dream Team with Takagi and Shoichi Ichimiya as owners. In 2003, Ichimiya was appointed representative director. On December 28, 2005, Ichimiya announced his retirement from professional wrestling and stepped down from his position in the company, leaving Takagi as the sole owner and new president. In 2009, DDT changed its legal form of incorporation to a kabushiki gaisha.

Pro Wrestling Noah
On January 31, 1999, All Japan Pro Wrestling (AJPW) founder Giant Baba died and left the company to his widow Motoko Baba as owner and Mitsuharu Misawa as president. Disagreements over the proposed direction for the company led Misawa to leave AJPW on May 28, 2000, to form a new promotion called Pro Wrestling Noah. He was followed in this venture by almost the entire AJPW roster. The promotion quickly rose in popularity and was even named best promotion in 2004 and 2005, as well as having the best weekly television show in 2003 by the Wrestling Observer.

On June 13, 2009, after taking a belly to back suplex from Akitoshi Saito, Misawa lost consciousness in the ring and was taken to a hospital. He was pronounced dead in the hospital later that day due to spinal damage. Two weeks later, Akira Taue was named as Misawa's successor, taking over as president of Noah.

In March 2012, a scandal revealed that some of the Noah management had had ties to a Yakuza syndicate between 2003 and 2010. As part of the fallout, Noah lost its TV show. In the years that followed, many major stars such as Kenta Kobashi, Kenta and Jun Akiyama left the company.

On October 1, 2016, it was announced that Noah had been purchased by IT company Estbee, Co., Ltd. As a result, former AJPW president Masayuki Uchida replaced Taue as president. At the end of 2016, relations between Noah and New Japan Pro-Wrestling (NJPW) reportedly turned "extremely sour" and NJPW pulled all of its wrestlers from Noah. In the months following the end of the relationship, Noah's attendance numbers went down by 29%. On January 29, 2019, Uchida announced that Lidet Entertainment had acquired 75% of Noah's shares.

CyberAgent and the creation of CyberFight
On September 1, 2017, 100% of DDT's shares were sold to the CyberAgent company. Sanshiro Takagi remained as the DDT president. On January 28, 2020, it was announced that CyberAgent had purchased Pro Wrestling Noah from Lidet Entertainment. On July 27, 2020, it was announced that Noah, DDT Pro-Wrestling and the DDT Foods company would merge in a new company that would eventually be called CyberFight. The decision came after financial troubles faced by Noah and DDT due in part to the COVID-19 pandemic. Sanshiro Takagi was named as president of the promotion and he established a plan of running events at the Tokyo Dome and overtaking NJPW in popularity. It was also revealed that the Noah and DDT brands would not be retired and would maintain their unique and current brand names, logos, color scheme, etc. and would act as two separate brands within CyberFight.

On June 6, 2021, CyberFight held its first event promoted under the CyberFight name, CyberFight Festival 2021, at the Saitama Super Arena.

Personnel

Current championships

DDT Pro-Wrestling

Pro Wrestling Noah

Tokyo Joshi Pro Wrestling

Ganbare☆Pro-Wrestling

See also

Professional wrestling in Japan
List of professional wrestling promotions in Japan
Pro Wrestling Noah
DDT Pro-Wrestling
WWE brand extension

References

External links

2020 establishments in Japan
Japanese professional wrestling promotions
CyberAgent